Zachary Bagans (born April 5, 1977) is an American paranormal investigator, actor, television personality, museum operator, and author. He is the principal host of the Travel Channel series Ghost Adventures.

Early life 
Bagans was born in Washington, D.C. and raised in Glen Ellyn, Illinois. He graduated from Glenbard West High School.

Career

Ghost Adventures

In 2004, Bagans teamed up with Nick Groff and Aaron Goodwin to produce a documentary-style film called Ghost Adventures. The film aired on the SciFi Channel in 2007. A successor series premiered in 2008 on the Travel Channel and has aired for 19 seasons as of 2019. Ghost hunting shows in general, and Ghost Adventures in particular, have been accused of fakery.

From 2014 to 2016, Bagans helmed a spin-off series titled Ghost Adventures: Aftershocks, which focused on changes to people's lives after prior Ghost Adventures investigations.

One of Bagans' more notable claims from the show is his alleged communication with deceased actor David Strickland of NBC's Suddenly Susan. Strickland committed suicide at the Oasis Motel in Las Vegas in 1999. Bagans claims to have recorded Strickland's voice nearly a decade following his death, and included this recording in a track on the album NecroFusion. No known scientific analysis has been attempted on the raw recording, including any comparison of the voice heard on the Electronic Voice Phenomena recording to that of the famous actor.

Museum
On April 2, 2016, Deadly Possessions premiered on the Travel Channel; the show featured Bagans finding items for a prospective "haunted museum" in Las Vegas, Nevada. The museum opened to the public in October 2017. It consists of 33 rooms with various artifacts on display. Visitors are given guided tours of the rooms. Some of the items on display include Bela Lugosi's mirror, the Dybbuk box, Peggy the Doll, and Jack Kevorkian's "Death Van". Some of the claims attached to the artifacts have been criticised. Both the Lugosi mirror and Captain Smith mirror kept in the museum have been claimed to have dubious provenance.

In 2018, the museum received Las Vegas Mayor's award for historic preservation and adaptive reuse.
  	
In 2021, the transaxle salvaged from the American actor James Dean's Porsche 550 Spyder was added to the museum's collection.

The Haunted Museum
In May 2021, Discovery+ Channel announced its plans to broadcast The Haunted Museum, an upcoming horror anthology show for which Zak Bagans will be the host and an executive producer. The series will be filmed in Las Vegas, Nevada and Toronto, Canada by the Cream Productions with Eli Roth as a filmmaker and Matt Booi, Kate Harrison Karman and David Brady as executive producers.

The museum also contains a large painting of P.T. Barnum, whom Bagans is said to idolize.

Books
Bagans co-wrote a book with author Kelly Crigger titled Dark World: Into the Shadows with the Lead Investigator of the Ghost Adventures Crew. On September 23, 2011, the book debuted on The New York Times Best Seller list at No. 18.

In December, 2019, Bagans published the book Ghost-Hunting For Dummies. The book 'outlining the history of ghost-hunting, including true accounts and stories from Bagans’ famous cases and investigations, and explains how anyone can get started in investigating the supernatural." Writing for Skeptical Inquirer magazine, paranormal investigator Kenneth Biddle observes that throughout much of the book Bagans displays a strong bias against skeptics and scientists. The Skeptical Inquirer and the Society for Psychical Research noted similarities between several passages in the book and those by other writers.

Personal life 
Bagans lives in Las Vegas, Nevada. He previously lived in Summerlin, Nevada.

Filmography

References

External links
 

Year of birth missing (living people)
Living people
Male actors from Las Vegas
American documentary film directors
American documentary film producers
American male television actors
American reality television producers
American television hosts
Male actors from Washington, D.C.
Paranormal investigators
Writers from Nevada
Writers from Washington, D.C.
Ghost Adventures
American curators
American writers on paranormal topics
Film directors from Washington, D.C.
People from Glen Ellyn, Illinois